= Abulak =

Coptic martyr and saint

Saint and Martyr
- Venerated in: Coptic Church
- Feast: June 9

Abulak is a martyr and saint of the Coptic Church.

Abulak was martyred with some two hundred companions.

Their feast day is June 9.

== Sources ==
- Holweck, F. G. A Biographical Dictionary of the Saints. St. Louis, Missouri, US: B. Herder Book Co. 1924.
